Société Nationale Air Mali, or Air Mali as it was most commonly known, was the former national airline of the Republic of Mali. It had its head office in Bamako.

History

In June 1960, the Federal Assembly of the newly independent Mali Federation voted to set up a new national airline to be known as Air Mali. Société Nationale Air Mali was founded by the Malian government on 27 October 1960 with the intent of becoming the newly independent country's national airline. When the airline was founded, the legislation under which the airline was set up gave the airline exclusive rights on domestic flights, and international flights from the country to the outside world. The company which was founded with startup capital of CFA 50 million, was given the right to sell up to 45% of its shares to private investors; however, very few were sold.

Technical assistance was provided to the airline by the Soviet airline Aeroflot, which also provided equipment for the airline to begin operations. The British government donated three ex-British European Airways Douglas DC-3s, which the British purchased for GBP 70,000. The airline began flight operations in 1961, but initially only operated executive services for government officials from Bamako to various administratives centres on the country, and joined the International Air Transport Association in July 1961. The first domestic route which was taken over from Air France was one which linked Bamako to Gao on the River Niger, the once capital of the Songhai Empire. Prior to taking over the flight, Air France operated a weekly service with Douglas DC-4 equipment, and once flights were inaugurated by Air Mali, service was increased to twice-weekly with Douglas DC-3 equipment.

On 20 March 1961, a contract was signed in Moscow for the supply of a number of Ilyushin Il-18, Ilyushin Il-14, Antonov An-2 and Mil Mi-2 helicopters. The two Il-18s were delivered in August 1961, and with them Air Mali began and expanded its international network to include Paris, Casablanca and Marseille. The aircraft were initially flown with Soviet crews whilst African crews were trained in their operations. The airline began flights to Ghana in December 1961, and regional destinations, some inherited from Union Aéromaritime de Transport, included Monrovia, Abidjan, Accra, Douala, Brazzaville, Dakar and Conakry, utilising the Il-14s and DC-3s.

Air Mali was the first airline to provide service to many Malian cities which had previously not received air services. The airline's domestic network was for the most part unprofitable, however, this was subsidised by profits the airline made on its regional and international networks. The Bamako-Accra route which was suspended at the time of the 1966 coup in Ghana was restarted in 1967, and on 14 September of the same year Aviaexport announced the signing of a deal with Air Mali for the supply of two Antonov An-24, which when delivered were operated on domestic and regional routes, such as Bamako-Mopti-Goundam-Timbouctou-Gao-Niamey. The airline was forced to seek a replacement for the Il-18s by the end of the 1960s, as the turboprops had become too expensive to operate and maintain.

The airline's first jet aircraft, a Boeing 727-100C was acquired in 1971 to enable the airline to service longer-range international routes to Paris, Marseille and Casablanca. The 727 was joined not long after by a Boeing 737-100 for use on medium-range regional routes in Africa. By , Air Mali had 577 employees; at this time, the fleet included one Antonov An-24B, one Boeing 707-320C, one Boeing 727-100C, one Ilyushin Il-18 and two Twin Otters that flew international routes to Abidjan, Accra, Banjul, Brazzaville, Casablanca, Conakry, Douala, Freetown, Lagos, Libreville, Lome, Monrovia, Niamey and Paris, and domestic services to Gao, Goundam, Kayes, Kenieba, Mopti, Nara, Nioro, Timbuctou and Yelimane.

On 22 February 1985, the An-24 experienced an engine explosion upon take-off from Timbuktu Airport, eventually crashing before reaching the airport of departure. Following this accident, and also because of large debts the airline had incurred, the government forced the airline to close down in 1988 with its operations being taken over by Malitas in 1989.

Destinations 
The airline served the following destinations throughout its history.

Fleet 

The airline operated the following equipment all through its history:

Airbus A300B4
Antonov An-2
Antonov An-24B
Antonov An-24RV
Boeing 707-320C
Boeing 727-100C
Boeing 737-200
Caravellle III
Caravelle 10B
Douglas C-47A
Ilyushin Il-14
Ilyushin Il-14P
Ilyushin Il-18D
Ilyushin Il-18V
Twin Otter

Accidents and incidents 
According to Aviation Safety Network, Air Mali experienced five hull-loss events throughout its history. Following is a list of these events; four of them were deadly, totalling 111 fatalities.

See also

 Transport in Mali

References

Airlines established in 1960
Airlines disestablished in 1988
Defunct airlines of Mali
Government-owned airlines
1960 establishments in Mali
1988 disestablishments in Mali
Companies based in Bamako